The Venerable James Bond was an Anglican priest in England during the mid 16th Century.

Bond was educated at Magdalen College, Oxford, becoming a Fellow in 1539. He was appointed Fellow in 1564 and Praelector in 1578. He held livings at Shepton Mallett, Stogumber and Bridestowe. He was appointed a Canon Residentiary of Wells Cathedral in 1544 and Archdeacon of Bath in 1560, holding both posts until his death  25 November 1570.

Notes 

Alumni of Magdalen College, Oxford
Fellows of Magdalen College, Oxford
Archdeacons of Bath
16th-century English people
1570 deaths